Dhenki, Dhiki or Dhinki is an old style rice mill or husk lever found in Nepal, Bangladesh and Indian states of Assam, West Bengal and Odisha. It is usually made of hard wood. It has a fulcrum supporting a weight. Due to the force of the weight upon the rice in the pods, the rice and the golden brown husks separate. Dhenki used to be operated by women to produce rice from paddy and grind rice to powder.

Construction 
Dhenki is traditionally made of wood and some iron. Carpenters build most parts of it where a blacksmith would attach an iron ring to the tip of the lever.

Uses 
The Assamese farming society uses it to retrieve rice from raw paddy grain, to make dry rice flakes, rice powder later to process it to make various delicious dry food items called pithas. Dhenki is still in use some part of rural Odisha. Dhenki is also used in parts of rural Bengal.

In popular culture 
In the Satyajit Ray's Bengali movie Ashani Sanket, the actresses were seen operating dhenki for a short period of time. Odia author Fakir Mohan Senapati has mentioned of dhenki in his literary works.

References 

Agricultural machinery
Rice production in India
History of agriculture in India
Articles containing video clips
Nepalese culture